Ahmad Latiff Khamarudin (born 29 May 1979) is a former professional footballer who last played in the S.League.

Once touted as a successor to golden boy Fandi Ahmad, he can play as an attacking midfielder or striker with his talented playmaking skills. He is also capable at playing as a full-back later in his career.

However, due to his consistent bad disciplinary track record for the national team and club sides, he is deemed the 'bad boy' of Singapore football.

His various nicknames include the frequently used "bad boy of Singapore football" for his disciplinary problems on and off the pitch, and also "the blond bombshell" in reference to his bleached blond hair.

Club career
Ahmad Latiff started his career at Police FC (now known as Home United FC) in 1996, before moving to Geylang United FC the following year.

In 1998, his sparkling performances led Singapore to win the Tiger Cup, the nation's first international trophy, despite getting sent off in the final against Vietnam.

His flamboyant performances caught the eyes of many top football coaches in Asia, who were confident that he would be the next big thing in Asian football. However, his disciplinary problems had got the better of him and he failed to live up to the high expectations set for him.

In 1999, he moved to SAFFC where he helped the club win the S.League title in the following season. In 2001, he made his first career move abroad to Indonesia before coming back to SAFFC in 2002, where he played as a playmaker instead of a striker in which he led the team to a runaway S-League title win.

In 2004, he moved to Woodlands Wellington FC but he was unable to capture the blistering form from his days in SAFFC.

Eventually in 2006, he made his move abroad once again to Johor FA, which played in the Malaysian Premier League. He played well for the side along with fellow Singaporean and Lions skipper, Aide Iskandar. After the Malaysian football season ended, he was loaned together with Aide Iskandar to Tampines Rovers FC for the rest of S.League season.

Prior to the start of the 2007 S-League season, Latiff returned to his former club, Woodlands Wellington FC. He was appointed as the club captain by then-manager, Jorg Steinbrunner, and led Woodlands Wellington FC to their first piece of silverware in their history, the inaugural Singtel League Cup.

On 2 July 2008, Ahmad Latiff made his debut for Singapore Armed Forces FC in the S.League. It was his third spell at the club after previously playing for the Warriors in 1999 and 2002.

Latiff made very important contributions to SAFFC in his third spell, scoring against PSMS Medan in the qualifying round to send the Warriors into the AFC Champions League group stages for the very first time.

He also netted a splendid volley against Shanghai Shenhua in the fifth game of the competition's group stages, helping his team win their first ever point in the AFC Champions League.

In 2010, Ahmad Latiff moved to Tampines Rovers where he helped them to two consecutive S.League titles in 2011 and 2012. Since returning to the S.League in 2009, he has appeared in 29 Asian Football Confederation matches, with SAFFC in the 2009 AFC Champions League and 2010 AFC Champions League, as well as Tampines Rovers in the 2011 AFC Cup and 2012 AFC Cup, scoring 5 goals in the process.

International career
Ahmad Latiff made his debut for Singapore against Lebanon on 24 May 1997.

In 1998, his sterling performances led Singapore to win the Tiger Cup, the nation's first international trophy, despite getting sent off in the final win against Vietnam. However, due to his poor disciplinary track record, he had been in and out of the |Singapore team since the 1998 Tiger Cup win.

Ahmad was recalled to the Singapore in 2006 after his good performances for Johor FA but was axed by coach, Raddy Avramovic, after he reacted angrily to the coach's decision to substitute him after just 25 minutes during Singapore's Asian Cup qualifying match against Iraq in the United Arab Emirates. Ahmad has never played for Singapore since that incident.

Club career statistics

Ahmad Latiff Khamaruddin's Profile

All numbers encased in brackets signify substitute appearances.
*Tampines Rovers appeared in the AFC Cup in 2011 & 2012.

International goals

Honours

Club
Happy Valley
Hong Kong First Division: 2000-01
Hong Kong League Cup: 2000-01
Singapore Armed Forces
S.League: 2002, 2008, 2009
Singapore Cup: 2008

PDRM
Malaysia Premier League: 2007

Tampines Rovers
S.League: 2011, 2012
Singapore Cup: 2006

Woodlands Wellington
Singapore League Cup: 2007

International
Singapore
ASEAN Football Championship: 1998

Individual
SAFFC-Warriors' Player of the Year: 2010

References

Videos
youtube.com

External links

sleague.com
data2.7m.cn

safwarriors.com.sg
safwarriors.com.sg

Singaporean footballers
Singapore international footballers
Singaporean expatriate footballers
Warriors FC players
Singaporean expatriate sportspeople in Malaysia
Expatriate footballers in Malaysia
1979 births
Living people
Geylang International FC players
Singaporean expatriate sportspeople in Indonesia
Expatriate footballers in Indonesia
Persikabo Bogor players
Expatriate footballers in Hong Kong
Happy Valley AA players
Woodlands Wellington FC players
Tampines Rovers FC players
PDRM FA players
Tanjong Pagar United FC players
Singapore Premier League players
Association football forwards